Matthew Brian Meadows (born November 21, 1975) is a retired Major League Baseball relief pitcher.

Meadows pitched with the Florida Marlins for two years. He won 11 games in back to back seasons (1998, 1999) despite having an ERA over 5.00 in those seasons.

In 2000, he was traded to the San Diego Padres, he made 22 starts for the Padres before being traded to the Kansas City Royals. He finished the season with a record of 13-10 and an ERA of 5.13 in 33 games.

In 2001, he had a 1-6 record with an ERA of 6.97 in 10 games for the Royals. He was released following the 2001 season.

In 2002, Meadows signed with the Pittsburgh Pirates. From 2003-2005, Meadows pitched exclusively out of the bullpen for the Pirates, appearing in a total of 167 games over that span.

In 2006, Meadows signed with the Tampa Bay Devil Rays. He had a 5.17 ERA in 53 games for the Devil Rays.

He retired following the 2006 season from baseball.

Meadows graduated from Charles Henderson High School in Troy, Alabama, where he played baseball. In the offseason, he designates time and effort in support of the Garth Brooks' Teammates for Kids Foundation. Meadows is also involved in the March of Dimes program in Alabama. He was originally signed by Florida scout Bill Singer.

Meadows was invited to spring training  with the Cincinnati Reds, but he did not make the team.

External links

1975 births
Living people
Major League Baseball pitchers
Baseball players from Montgomery, Alabama
Florida Marlins players
San Diego Padres players
Kansas City Royals players
Pittsburgh Pirates players
Tampa Bay Devil Rays players
Gulf Coast Marlins players
Kane County Cougars players
Brevard County Manatees players
Portland Sea Dogs players
Omaha Royals players
Nashville Sounds players